The Israel Anti-Boycott Act (IABA) was a proposed anti-BDS law and amendment to the Export Administration Act of 1979 designed to allow U.S. states to enact laws requiring contractors to sign pledges promising not to boycott any goods from Israel, or their contracts would be terminated. 

The proposed law was a response to the BDS movement's call for boycotts, divestment and sanctions against Israel. Lawmakers hope to curb the growth of BDS which they consider to be anti-Semitic by making it difficult to participate in anti-Israel boycotts. As of 2020, 32 state legislatures have already passed bills similar to IABA. If the law was passed in the federal legislature, it would be easier to enforce. Critics of the law and supporters of BDS claims that it is unconstitutional. They claim that participation in politically motivated boycotts is a form of free speech protected by the First Amendment and that anti-BDS laws are a form of lawfare. 

IABA was drafted by Senators Ben Cardin (D-Maryland) and Rob Portman (R-Ohio) and introduced to the 115th session of Congress in 2018. It had 58 cosponsors in the Senate, and 292 cosponsors in the House (216 Republicans, 76 Democrats). The act consisted of House and Senate bills HR 1697 and S 720 and died in Congress. However, there is strong opposition to BDS in American politics and the act is expected to make a resurgence in the federal legislature in the future. In the 115th session of Congress it had 58 cosponsors in the Senate (42 Republicans, 15 Democrats, 1 Independent).

Legislative history 

The bill was introduced by the identical House and Senate bills HR 1697 and S 720 on March 23, 2017 by Republican Representative Peter Roskam and Democratic Senator Benjamin Cardin respectively. 

The purpose of the bill was to amend the Export Administration Act of 1979 and the Export-Import Bank Act of 1945 to bar US citizens from supporting boycotts against Israel, including its settlements. Violations would be subject to minimum civil penalty of $250,000 and a maximum criminal penalty of $1 million and 20 years in prison. 

The bill cited the United Nations Human Rights Council's (UNHRC) March 2016 resolution calling for the creation of a database of companies operating in the occupied Palestinian territories as an example of a boycott supposedly covered by the law. Anyone choosing to not buy from companies listed in the database could, according to the bill's critics, be in violation and risk facing penalties or even jail time.

The House Foreign Affairs Committee passed an amended version of the bill on June 28, 2018 and on March 3, 2018, Cardin released an amended version in the Senate. The amended bill removed the jail time provisions, but knowing violations of the bill could still lead to criminal financial penalties of up to $1 million. All three versions of the bill were unconstitutional, according to those critics who criticized it on First Amendment grounds. The amended versions of the bill were also criticized by proponents of anti-BDS laws. Republicans Alan Clemmons and Joseph Sabag of the Israeli American Council wrote in an op-ed in The Hill:

In late 2018, attempts were made from both sides of the aisle to include the bill in the Appropriations bill. The attempts were criticized by Senator Bernie Sanders (I-Vermont) and Dianne Feinstein (D-California) who stated:

Senator Kirsten Gillibrand who originally co-sponsored the bill withdrew her support from it in 2017, citing concerns over free speech. She remains opposed to the BDS movement. The pro-Israeli lobby group AIPAC criticized her change of heart.

Combating BDS Act
In 2019, Senator Marco Rubio, who cosponsored the Israel Anti-Boycott Act, introduced the Combating BDS Act, cosponsored by Senator Cory Gardner (R-Colorado), Senator Mitch McConnell (R-Kentucky), and Senator Roy Blunt (R-Missouri). The bill is meant to enable states to pass anti-boycott legislation with federal blessing. It has received reception similar to IABA. On February 5, 2019, the Senate passed the bill and other Middle East policy bills.  it seems as though the House will not be taking up the bill in the foreseeable future.

Support and opposition 
Supporters of the bill argue that it does not stymie free speech. The bills co-sponsor Senator Marco Rubio (R-Florida) tweeted: "Opposition to our bill isn’t about free speech. Companies are FREE to boycott Israel. But local and state governments should be free to end contracts with companies that do". Eugene Kontorovich who has helped states draft anti-BDS laws has argued that they aren't about free speech, but that those wishing to boycott Israel should not benefit from government contracts or taxpayer money.

AIPAC continues to support the IABA and similar legislation, saying that, "(the legislation) protects the First Amendment rights of those who choose to boycott Israel in their personal capacity." However, organizations like the ACLU disagree and have sought lawsuits on those grounds.

See also 
 Anti-BDS laws
 Boycott, Divestment and Sanctions
 Boycotts of Israel
 Law for Prevention of Damage to State of Israel through Boycott

References

External links
 Text - S_2673 - 113th Congress (2013-2014) United States-Israel Strategic Partnership Act of 2014 in the Library of Congress

Anti-Palestinian sentiment
Opposition to Boycott, Divestment and Sanctions
Boycotts of Israel
Israel–United States relations
Proposed legislation of the 115th United States Congress